The Merlucciidae, commonly called merluccid hakes , are a family of cod-like fish, including most hakes.

The best known species are in the genera Macruronus and Merluccius. Several species are important commercial fish, for example the blue grenadier (Macruronus novaezelandiae) that is fished in the southwest Pacific and the North Pacific hake (Merluccius productus) that is fished off western North America.

The taxonomy of the Merluccidae is not settled, with some authorities raising two or three subfamilies, the Merluccinae,  Macruroninae, and Steindachneriinae, while other authorities raise the latter two into their own families, the  Macruronidae  and the monotypic Steindachneriidae. 

This would mean the genera would be arranged as:

 Steindachneriidae
 Steindachneria

 Macruronidae
 Lyconodes
 Lyconus
 Macruronus

 Merlucciidae ss
 Merluccius

References

External links
Terra Curanda Fishery Statistics

 
Marine fish families